Two-way or Two Way may refer to:

 "Two Way" (song), by KT Tunstall and James Bay, 2016
 "2-Way", a 2002 song by Lil' Romeo
Two-way pager, a communications device
 Two-way, Cincinnati chili topped on spaghetti

See also

 3-Way (disambiguation)